And then may refer to:

 The Short-circuit evaluation operator "and"
 The Japanese novel Sorekara, literally And Then